Takatani (written: 高谷) is a Japanese surname. Notable people with the surname include:

, Japanese artist
, Japanese sport wrestler

Japanese-language surnames